Natan Panz (September 28, 1917 – April 28, 1948) was a Jewish football player from Mandatory Palestine, who played for Maccabi Tel Aviv, Beitar Tel Aviv, and Mandatory Palestine national football team for only one match. He was also an Irgun member and was killed during the 1947–48 Civil War in Mandatory Palestine in battle with the British Army.

Biography
Panz was born in Vitebsk, then in the Russian Republic shortly before the October Revolution. In 1921 the family left Soviet Russia to Eretz Israel and settled in Tel Aviv. Panz studied in Herzliya Hebrew Gymnasium and Nordia Gymnasium before the American University of Beirut.  He was employed as a clerk in the Tel Aviv municipality.

Career
Panz started playing football in Maccabi Tel Aviv's youth team and appeared for the senior team at an early age. Panz's performance during Maccabi's tour of North America,  landed him an offer to join a New York club, but Panz refused.  Panz won two championships, in 1936 and 1937 and made one appearance with the Mandatory Palestine national football team, against Greece, during 1938 FIFA World Cup qualification.

In 1939, Panz transferred to Beitar Tel Aviv and led the club to promotion to the top division. During the following years, the club won two cups (1940 and 1942) and a joint-championship (1945), as well as finishing as runners-up both in the league and the cup. Panz also took part in Beitar's victory over Hajduk Split in 1944.

In 1947, after Beitar Tel Aviv was forced to disband by the Mandatory Government and was reformed as Nordia Tel Aviv, Panz refused to appear in the newly reformed team and transferred back to Maccabi Tel Aviv.

Death
As the 1947–48 Civil War in Mandatory Palestine broke out, Panz aided both the Haganah and the Irgun in their defensive activities on the Jaffa frontline, before joining the Irgun, where he was appointed a ranking officer. He participated in a raid on a British munitions train in which arms were seized, helping enable the Irgun to attack Jaffa. On 25 April 1948, the Irgun launched an offensive on Jaffa, which was countered by British forces. Panz was commanding an armored vehicle in Menashiya and was killed when a British armored vehicle shelled it.

Honours
league championship (3):
 With Maccabi Tel Aviv: 1935–36, 1937
 With Beitar Tel Aviv: 1944–45 (joint-championship)
Israel State Cup (2):
1940, 1942

References

External links

Belarusian Jews
People from Tel Aviv
Herzliya Hebrew Gymnasium alumni
American University of Beirut alumni
Maccabi Tel Aviv F.C. players
Beitar Tel Aviv F.C. players
1917 births
1948 deaths
Irgun members
Israeli people of the 1948 Arab–Israeli War
Association footballers not categorized by position
Israeli footballers
Israel international footballers
Burials at Nahalat Yitzhak Cemetery
Soviet emigrants to Mandatory Palestine